Acestorides is the name of several people from Classical history:

Acestorides of Corinth (fl. 4th century BC) was a native of Corinth who was made supreme commander of Syracuse by the citizens of the Sicilian polis of Syracuse in 320 BC and was able to banish the tyrant Agathocles from the city. Acestorides then left Syracuse in 319 BC and Sostratus became the leader of the city until Agathocles recaptured the city in 317 BC.

Another Acestorides, whose date is unknown, wrote four books of mythical stories relating to every city.  In these he gave many real historical accounts, as well as those merely fantastical, but he entitled them  ("myths") to avoid calumny and to indicate the pleasant nature of the work.  It was compiled from Conon, Apollodorus, Protagoras and others.

References

Ancient Corinthians
Ancient Syracuse
Ancient Greek mythographers
4th-century BC people